La Cité may refer to:
 La Cité-Limoilou, central borough of Quebec City
 La Cité (Lausanne), a district of the city of Lausanne, in Switzerland
 La Cité, former French town, today part of Coulounieix-Chamiers
 La Cité collégiale, nicknamed and now officially branded as La Cité
 La Cité, the French-language title of the 2010 Canadian film, City of Shadows